Sieburth is a surname. Notable people with the surname include:

Richard Sieburth (born 1949), American translator
John Sieburth (1927–2006), Canadian biologist
Scott Sieburth, American chemist, son of John